Tula Belle (28 July 1906 – 13 October 1992) was an American child film actress. She was born in what is now Oslo, Norway.

She starred in The Blue Bird.

Filmography

The Brand of Cowardice (1916)
 Over the Hill (1917)
 The Vicar of Wakefield (1917)
The Blue Bird (1918)
A Doll's House (1918) based on A Doll's House by Henrik Ibsen
At the Mercy of Men (1918)
Deliverance (1919)
The Miracle Man (1919)
Old Dad (1920)

References

External links

1906 births
1992 deaths
20th-century Norwegian actresses
Norwegian child actresses
Norwegian film actresses
Norwegian expatriates in the United States